The Hanseatic Cross (German: Hanseatenkreuz) was a military decoration of the three Hanseatic city-states of Bremen, Hamburg and Lübeck, who were members of the German Empire during World War I. Each republic established its own version of the cross, but the design and award criteria were similar for each.

Establishment and criteria

The Hanseatic Cross was jointly instituted by agreement of the senates of the three cities, with each senate ratifying the award on different days.  The Lübeck version was established first, on 21 August 1915.  The Hamburg version followed on 10 September and the Bremen version on 14 September.  The cross was awarded for merit in war, and could be awarded to civilians as well as military personnel. When awarded for bravery or combat merit, it was the three cities' equivalent of the Prussian Iron Cross.

Description

The Hanseatic Cross came in only one class, a cross worn from a ribbon on the left chest.  The cross was a red-enameled silver cross pattée which bore the arms of the relevant city-state on the center medallion. The reverse was identical for all three versions and the center medallion bore the phrase "Für Verdienst im Kriege" ("for merit in war") and the date "1914".

Recipients

There were approximately 50,000 awards of the Hanseatic Cross of Hamburg, the largest Hanseatic city. The Bremen Hanseatic Cross was awarded approximately 20,000 times. Lübeck was the smallest of the Hanseatic cities, and its Hanseatic Cross was awarded approximately 8-10,000 times. The roll for the Lübeck Hanseatic Cross have been transcribed by an international team of phaleristic researchers from Germany, Belgium and the Netherlands. The complete roll was expected to be available by fall 2008/spring 2009.

References

Dr. Kurt-Gerhard Klietmann, Pour le Mérite und Tapferkeitsmedaille (1966).

Cross

Military awards and decorations of Imperial Germany
German Empire in World War I
20th century in Bremen (state)
20th century in Hamburg
History of Lübeck
Military awards and decorations of World War I
Awards established in 1915